Kimberly Pita Quinn is an American actress, writer and film producer. She made her film debut playing a leading role and co-writing in the 1999 independent drama film Winding Roads. Quinn later produced and played supporting roles in a number of films, include St. Vincent (2014), Hidden Figures (2016), and The Starling (2020). She is married to director Theodore Melfi, together they own production company Goldenlight Films.

Career
Quinn began her career appearing in an episodes of television shows include Ned and Stacey, Suddenly Susan, Nash Bridges, Diagnosis: Murder, NYPD Blue, Without a Trace and House. In 1999, she co-wrote and played a leading role in the independent drama film Winding Roads directed by her future husband Theodore Melfi. After decade of small parts, in 2010, she took series regular role in the FX drama series Terriers. The series was canceled after one season. From 2013 to 2014, she starred as Tess Masterson in the ABC Family drama series Twisted.

In 2014, Quinn co-starred and co-produced comedy-drama St. Vincent starring Bill Murray and Melissa McCarthy. She co-produced 2016 Academy Award for Best Picture-nominated biographical drama film Hidden Figures starring Taraji P. Henson. The following year, she produced black comedy El Camino Christmas for Netflix, and had a recurring role in the Netflix thriller Gypsy. In 2019, she executive produced with her production company Goldenlight Films, and co-starred in the ABC comedy pilot Nana starring Katey Sagal. Later she and Melfi produced drama film The Starling starring Melissa McCarthy. Quinn also co-wrote and produced animated film The Fourteenth Goldfish alongside Melfi.

Personal life
Quinn is married to writer-director Theodore Melfi. Together, they own production company Goldenlight Films.

Filmography

Film

Television

References

External links

20th-century American actresses
21st-century American actresses
American film actresses
American television actresses
Living people
Place of birth missing (living people)
Year of birth missing (living people)
American film producers